Venezuela competed at the 2012 Summer Paralympics in London, United Kingdom from August 29 to September 9, 2012.

Medallists

References

Nations at the 2012 Summer Paralympics
2012
2012 in Venezuelan sport